The 6th Jebtsundamba Khutughtu (1842–1848), was the sixth incarnation of the Jebtsundamba Khutuktu, the spiritual heads of the Gelug lineage of Tibetan Buddhism in Mongolia, and the fourth of Tibetan descent. He was the second Jebtsundamba Khutuktu selected by the lottery procedure of the Golden urn. His personal name was Luvsantüvdenchoyjijaltsan and his Tibetan ceremonial name Blo-bzang-dpal-ldan-bstan-pa.

The son of local donkey herders from Tibet, he was found and determined by monks after the death of the previous (fifth) Jebtsundamba Khutughtu to be the sixth incarnation. After his selection at the age of five he was sent to Urga, present-day Ulaanbaatar. He died there of smallpox after only 59 days. His remains were kept in Urga at the Dambadarjaa monastery.

News of his death was first sent to the Chinese emperor Daoguang who then forwarded the message to Lhasa along with the assignment to select a new reincarnation. Until 1793 this message was given directly to the Dalai Lama; who was at that time the amban in Tibet.

After several months, a Mongolian delegation departed Urga for Lhasa to attend the selection process. After the final choice for the new Jebtsundamba Khutuktu was made, a part of the delegation returned to Urga to announce the news. Then, another large delegation from Urga was sent to Tibet to supervise the new incarnation on his inaugural journey from Tibet to Mongolia.

1842 births
1848 deaths
Jebtsundamba Khutuktus
Qing dynasty Tibetan Buddhists